Maximovitch is a Russian surname. Notable people with the surname include:

 Anna Maximovitch (1901-1943) Russian neuropsychiatrist who became a member of the Red Orchestra
 Basile Maximovitch (1902-1944) Russian mining engineer who also became a member of the Red Orchestra

Russian-language surnames